Aleksandar Zlatkov (born 31 January 1999) is a Bulgarian footballer who plays as a midfielder.

References

External links

1999 births
Living people
Bulgarian footballers
Bulgaria youth international footballers
Association football midfielders
PFC Slavia Sofia players
FC Lokomotiv Gorna Oryahovitsa players
First Professional Football League (Bulgaria) players